The Chou Wong Yi Kung Study Hall is a Grade II historic building in Shui Tau Tsuen, Yuen Long, Hong Kong. It was erected in 1685 by the Tang Clan, in honour of Chou Yu-te and Wang Lai-jen, two imperial officials whose pleading with the Emperor ended the coastal evacuation, and enabled the inhabitants to return to their homes in 1669.

Architectural style
The study hall is constructed in the typical style of the Qing dynasty period. The structure itself consists of two halls on each side of a central courtyard. The complex is designed to be symmetrical with an altar placed in the centre of the structure.

References

Yuen Long
Grade II historic buildings in Hong Kong